The 1979–80 SMU Mustangs men's basketball team represented Southern Methodist University during the 1979–80 men's college basketball season. This is Sonny Allen final year at SMU. The Mustangs finished with a record of 16-12, 7-9 in their conference.

Roster

Schedule

|-
!colspan=9 style=| Southwest tournament

Team players drafted into the NBA

References 

SMU Mustangs men's basketball seasons
SMU
SMU
SMU